Zürich Oerlikon railway station is a railway station located in the District 11 of Zürich. Together with Zurich Airport, it is one of the two major nodal points for local and regional public transportation in the northern part of Zürich. Oerlikon station is a keilbahnhof: tracks 1 and 2 are on the Zürich–Winterthur line, while tracks 3–8 are on the Oerlikon–Bülach line. The station building, located on the side of the station, is listed in the Swiss inventory of cultural property of national and regional significance as a Class B object of regional importance.

Eleven regional train lines of the Zürich S-Bahn serve the station as do several InterCity, InterRegio and RegioExpress lines. Serving approximately 85,000 daily rail passengers, Zürich Oerlikon is the seventh busiest railway station in Switzerland. It is furthermore served by three tramway and nine local bus lines.

The station has the central place of the city quarter Oerlikon with dedicated shopping areas to its south, the redeveloped former Maschinenfabrik Oerlikon to its north, and the Leutschenbach business quarter as well as Switzerlands most prominent indoor arena Hallenstadion to the east.

History 
On 27 December 1855 the line from Oerlikon to Winterthur via Wallisellen station was established by the Schweizerische Nordostbahn (NOB), and a temporary wooden railway station was built by A. Beckh and Jakob Friedrich Wanner. The following year the line was extendend to Zürich Hauptbahnhof through the Wipkingen Tunnel. Lines from Wallisellen to Uster (1856) and Oerlikon to Bülach via Glattbrugg station (1865) followed. The opening of these lines triggered the industrialisation of Oerlikon, and a massive population growth. In particular the large works of Maschinenfabrik Oerlikon was established immediately to the west of the station.

In 1865, the wooden railway station was replaced by a stone building. In 1877, the Schweizerische Nationalbahn (SNB) opened the Furttal railway line from Wettingen to Effretikon, via Seebach and Opfikon stations. This line was conceived as a freight bypass for Zürich and whilst it passed close to Oerlikon station, it did not serve it. In 1878 the SNB became insolvent, and was taken over by the NOB. In 1881, a link between the Oerlikon to Bülach line and the Furttal line was constructed to allow trains to run from Oerlikon to Opfikon, and in 1909 a curve was added to also allow trains to run from Oerlikon to Seebach. In 1912, the current station building replaced that of 1865.

In June 1969 the Käferberg Tunnel was opened, providing a second route to Hauptbahnhof. In October 1979 the line from Oerlikon under Zurich Airport and on to rejoin the main line to Winterthur at Bassersdorf (the Flughafenlinie) opened, including a new station directly under the airport terminal. In June 2014, the Weinberg Tunnel opened, providing a third route to Hauptbahnhof.

To complement the opening of the Weinberg tunnel, the station's infrastructure was renewed, with the provision of two additional platform tracks and the rebuilding of the station's bus and tram stops. The additional platforms and tracks were constructed on the north-western side of the station, partially on land occupied by the former office building of Maschinenfabrik Oerlikon, dating from the late 19th century and now a restaurant complex known as Gleis 9. Because of its cultural importance to the region, plans to demolish the building were rejected, and instead the  building was moved  to the west on specially laid tracks. The move took place in May 2012 and took 19 hours.

Layout and facilities 
The station is aligned on a south-west to north-east axis, and, following its expansion, has eight through platform tracks serving two side platforms and three island platforms. At the centre of the station the platforms are at or about street level, but the slope of the land means they are significantly above street level at the north-eastern end of the station, whilst the south-western approaches descend into a cutting and, eventually, tunnels. There are station entrances on both sides of the station, but the main station buildings are on the south-eastern side of the station, the same side as the centre of the suburb of Oerlikon. Pedestrian subways link both sides of the station and all platforms.

To the south-west of Oerlikon station, the line through the station divides into three lines, with fly-overs and dive-unders providing non-conflicting access routes to and from the different lines. The three lines all link to Zürich Hauptbahnhof by different tunnels through the intermediate ridge, these being the Wipkingen Tunnel, the Käferberg Tunnel and the Weinberg Tunnel. The first two of these approach the Hauptbahnhof from the west, giving access to both its upper level terminal platforms and its low level through platforms, whilst the Weinberg Tunnel enters the low level through platforms from the east.

To the north-east of Oerlikon station, the line divides into two within the station limits (keilbahnhof). The south-easternmost two platform tracks serve the line to Wallisellen station and beyond. The remaining platform tracks run together for further, but eventually divide to serve the routes to Seebach, Glattbrugg, Opfikon and Zurich Airport stations respectively.

The renovation of the station underpasses, completed in 2016, added more than 20 store fronts to the Bahnhof Oerlikon complex mostly below ground level. Prior to 2016, only two food vendors and one store were located on the station grounds itself. In Switzerland, the law requires that most stores close on Sundays; however, stores located in airports and railways are exempt, allowing the stores in Bahnhof Oerlikon to remain open year-round.

Operation

Train 
The station is an important and busy one. It is served by lines S2, S3, S6, S7, S8, S9, S14, S15, S16, S19, S21, and S24 of the Zürich S-Bahn. It is also called at by trains on the InterRegio (IR) lines from Zurich Airport to Basel SBB and Zurich Airport to Luzern, and the RegioExpress (RE) line from Zürich to Schaffhausen.

Train connections to Oerlikon from Zürich Hauptbahnhof are very frequent, and the ride takes only a few minutes. All trains stopping at Oerlikon also serve Hauptbahnhof providing, for most of the day, more than 20 trains per hour (tph) in each direction.

Summary of regional train services by Zürich S-Bahn:

 
 
 
 
 
 
 
 
 
 
 
 

During weekends, there are also four nighttime S-Bahn services (SN6, SN7, SN8, SN9) offered by ZVV:

Summary of long-distance services:

 : Genève-Aéroport –  –  –  –  – Oerlikon –  –  –  –  –  – 
 :  – Oerlikon –  –  –  –  –  –  –  –  –  –  –  –  –  –  –  – 
 :  – Rheinfelden (– ) –  –  –  (–  – ) –  (– Oerlikon – )
 :  - Oerlikon -  -

Tram/Bus 
Trams of both the Zürich tramway system and the Glattalbahn operate from a number of stops adjacent to both sides of the station, as do buses of both the Verkehrsbetriebe Zürich (VBZ) and Glattalbus (VBG). A stop complex on the south-eastern side of the station and known as Bahnhof Oerlikon is served by tram route 11, and buses 61, 62, 94, 768, 781 and 787. A second stop complex to the north-east of the station and known as Bahnhof Oerlikon Ost is served by tram routes 10 and 14, and buses 75, 768, 781 and 787. A third stop complex to the north-west of the station and known as Bahnhof Oerlikon Nord is served by buses 64 and 80. Between them these connect the station to much of the city of Zürich and to the Glatt Valley between Oerlikon and Zurich Airport.

Summary of tram and bus services:

Gallery

See also

History of rail transport in Switzerland
Rail transport in Switzerland

References

External links 

 
 Interactive station plan (Zürich Oerlikon)
 Station plan from SBB web site

Swiss Federal Railways stations
Oerlikon
Cultural property of regional significance in the canton of Zürich
Railway stations in Switzerland opened in 1855